Rosendahl is a municipality in the district of Coesfeld in the state of North Rhine-Westphalia, Germany.

In this municipality is located the Castle of Darfeld, internationally famous for having been the residence of Mary of the Divine Heart (1863–1899), the Countess Droste zu Vischering who became Sister of the Good Shepherd and received several revelations from God. She is best known for influencing Pope Leo XIII to consecrate the world to the Sacred Heart of Jesus.

References

Coesfeld (district)